Heteropsis is an Afrotropical butterfly genus from the subfamily Satyrinae in the family Nymphalidae.

Species
Heteropsis adolphei (Guérin-Méneville, 1843)
Heteropsis alaokola (Oberthür, 1916)
Heteropsis anceps (Oberthür, 1916)
Heteropsis andasibe Lees, 2003
Heteropsis andravahana (Mabille, 1878)
Heteropsis anganavo (Ward, 1871)
Heteropsis angolensis Kielland, 1994
Heteropsis angulifascia (Butler, 1879)
Heteropsis ankaratra (Ward, 1870)
Heteropsis ankoma (Mabille, 1878)
Heteropsis ankova (Ward, 1870)
Heteropsis antahala (Ward, 1872)
Heteropsis avaratra Lees & Kremen, 2016
Heteropsis avelona (Ward, 1870)
Heteropsis bicristata (Mabille, 1878)
Heteropsis centralis Aurivillius, 1903
Heteropsis comorana (Oberthür, 1916)
Heteropsis cowani (Butler, 1880)
Heteropsis decira (Plötz, 1880)
Heteropsis difficilis (Mabille, 1880)
Heteropsis drepana Westwood, 1850
Heteropsis eliasis (Hewitson, [1866])
Heteropsis elisi (Karsch, 1893)
Heteropsis erebennis (Oberthür, 1916)
Heteropsis erebina (Oberthür, 1916)
Heteropsis exocellata (Mabille, [1880])
Heteropsis fuliginosa (Mabille, 1878)
Heteropsis iboina (Ward, 1870)
Heteropsis laeta (Oberthür, 1916)
Heteropsis laetifica (Oberthür, 1916)
Heteropsis mabillei (Butler, 1879)
Heteropsis maeva (Mabille, 1878)
Heteropsis masoura (Hewitson, 1875)
Heteropsis narcissus (Fabricius, 1798)
Heteropsis narova (Mabille, 1877)
Heteropsis nigrescens (Bethune-Baker, 1908)
Heteropsis obscura (Oberthür, 1916)
Heteropsis ochracea Lathy, 1906
Heteropsis pallida (Oberthür, 1916)
Heteropsis paradoxa (Mabille, [1880])
Heteropsis parva (Butler, 1879)
Heteropsis parvidens (Mabille, 1880)
Heteropsis passandava (Ward, 1871)
Heteropsis pauper (Oberthür, 1916)
Heteropsis peitho (Plötz, 1880)
Heteropsis perspicua (Trimen, 1873)
Heteropsis phaea Karsch, 1890
Heteropsis sabas (Oberthür, 1923)
Heteropsis simonsii (Butler, 1877)
Heteropsis strato (Mabille, 1878)
Heteropsis strigula (Mabille, 1877)
Heteropsis subsimilis (Butler, 1879)
Heteropsis teratia (Karsch, 1894)
Heteropsis turbans (Oberthür, 1916)
Heteropsis turbata (Butler, 1880)
Heteropsis ubenica Thurau, 1903
Heteropsis undulans (Oberthür, 1916)
Heteropsis uniformis (Oberthür, 1916)
Heteropsis viettei Lees, 2003
Heteropsis vola (Ward, 1870)
Heteropsis wardii (Mabille, 1877)

External links 
"Heteropsis Westwood, 1850" at Markku Savela's Lepidoptera and Some Other Life Forms
Seitz, A. Die Gross-Schmetterlinge der Erde 13: Die Afrikanischen Tagfalter. Plate XIII 28

Elymniini
Butterfly genera
Taxa named by John O. Westwood